Jan Czerlinski (born May 11, 1967) is a Czech former professional ice hockey forward.

Czerlinski played 150 games in the Czechoslovak First Ice Hockey League for HC Pardubice and 68 games in the Czech Extraliga for KLH Jindřichův Hradec and HC Kometa Brno. He also played three games in the Italian Serie A for Courmaosta HC during the 1994–95 season.

References

External links

1967 births
Living people
SG Cortina players
Courmaosta HC players
Czech ice hockey forwards
HC Dynamo Pardubice players
HC Kobra Praha players
KLH Vajgar Jindřichův Hradec players
HC Kometa Brno players
Stadion Hradec Králové players
HC Tábor players
Czechoslovak ice hockey forwards
Czech expatriate ice hockey players in Germany
Czech expatriate sportspeople in Italy
Expatriate ice hockey players in Italy